Petr Franěk (born 6 April 1975 in Most) is a Czech former ice hockey goaltender.

Career
Franěk was drafted in the 8th round, 205th overall by the Quebec Nordiques in the 1993 NHL Entry Draft, but never played in the National Hockey League. He played in North America in the International Hockey League for the Quebec Rafales, Utah Grizzlies and the Las Vegas Thunder and also spent two seasons in the American Hockey League for the Hershey Bears. He then moved to Germany to play one season with the Nürnberg Ice Tigers before moving back to the Czech Republic where he played for HC Energie Karlovy Vary and HC Slavia Praha. He joined the Iserlohn Roosters in 2006, serving as a backup to Dimitrij Kotschnew. From 2007 until end of his career in 2014, he played for the HC Litvínov of the Czech Extraliga.

External links

1975 births
Brantford Smoke players
Czechoslovak ice hockey goaltenders
Czech ice hockey goaltenders
Hershey Bears players
Iserlohn Roosters players
Las Vegas Thunder players
Living people
Quebec Nordiques draft picks
Quebec Rafales players
Utah Grizzlies (IHL) players
HC Litvínov players
Sportspeople from Most (city)
Czech expatriate ice hockey players in Canada
Czech expatriate ice hockey players in the United States
Czech expatriate ice hockey players in Germany